The 2016 Indian Super League playoffs was the third playoffs series in the 2016 ISL season, the 2016 edition of the men's professional football league in India. The playoffs began on 10 December and concluded with the final on 18 December. The top four teams from the 2016 ISL regular season qualified for the playoffs with the semi-finals taking place over two-legs before the final in Kochi.

The playoffs ended with Atlético de Kolkata defeating the Kerala Blasters in a penalty shootout, 4–3, in the final. The match was a rematch of the 2014 ISL final which Atlético de Kolkata won as well 1–0.

2016 ISL season table

Bracket

Semi-finals

|}

Leg 1

Leg 2

 ATK won 3–2 on aggregate

 On aggregate 2–2, Kerala won on penalties

Final

Goalscorers

See also
 2016–17 in Indian football
 2016–17 I-League

References

2016 Indian Super League season